Wim Bokila (born 28 September 1987) is a Belgian footballer who plays as a forward for Belgian side KFC Kontich.

Personal life
Bokila was born in a footballing family. His father Ndingi Bokila Mandjombolo was known in the eighties as "the pearl of Harelbeke", being a valuable player and top scorer three times in a row at Belgian club K.R.C. Harelbeke, between 1980 and 1982.

His sister Esther and brothers Noé and Jeremy are also footballers, while Wim's older brother Paldy played for TOP Oss before giving up professional football and emigrating to Italy. His sister Aurelia is not a footballer. Neither is his mother Marie Veronique.

References

External links

Wim Bokila on Goal

1987 births
Living people
Footballers from Antwerp
Belgian sportspeople of Democratic Republic of the Congo descent
Belgian footballers
Belgian expatriate footballers
Association football forwards
Eerste Divisie players
Slovak Super Liga players
Liga Portugal 2 players
AGOVV Apeldoorn players
MŠK Žilina players
FC Etar 1924 Veliko Tarnovo players
S.C. Eendracht Aalst players
Achilles '29 players
S.C. Covilhã players
Ħamrun Spartans F.C. players
Jura Dolois Football players
Belgian expatriate sportspeople in the Netherlands
Expatriate footballers in the Netherlands
Belgian expatriate sportspeople in Slovakia
Expatriate footballers in Bulgaria
Belgian expatriate sportspeople in Bulgaria
Expatriate footballers in Slovakia
Belgian expatriate sportspeople in Portugal
Expatriate footballers in Portugal
Belgian expatriate sportspeople in Malta
Expatriate footballers in Malta
Belgian expatriate sportspeople in France
Expatriate footballers in France
Hoogstraten VV players